Kleber Koike Erbst (born October 16, 1989) is a Brazilian-born Japanese mixed martial artist who competes in the Featherweight division of Rizin Fighting Federation, where he is the current Rizin Featherweight champion. He has also competed in Konfrontacja Sztuk Walki (KSW), where is the former KSW Featherweight Champion.

Background 
Born in São Paulo, Brazil, to a Brazilian father of German and Japanese descent and a Japanese mother, Kleber lived in Brazil in his teenage years, until financial troubles led his parents to move to Japan. Erbst initially stayed in Brazil with relatives, but at the age of 14, joined them in Japan. Initially intending to help his parents and return to Brazil, but once he met jiu-jitsu, he decided to stay in Japan. When financial crisis hit Japan, his parents decided to move back to Brazil, leaving behind an 18 years old Erbst who wanted to stay. To finance his fighting career, Erbst took odd jobs such as construction, trash collection, etc. to pay for the sign-up fees.

Mixed martial arts career 
Bonsai Jiu-jitsu club competitor, submission specialist. His favorite technique is Triangle choke. A holder of a black belt Brazilian jiu-jitsu from the city of Iwata. In 2008–2014 he fought mainly at Japanese galas DEEP and Rings, beating at that time, among others of the former Shooto champion of Hideki Kadowaka.

Konfrontacja Sztuk Walki 
At the KSW 30 gala: Genesis defeated Anzor Azhiev by triangular choke in the 1st round.

After a successful debut for the federation KSW, he took part in a featherweight tournament organized by the Chinese federation Rebel FC, which won and became a champion, defeating the American Miguel Torres. At KSW 33: Materla vs. Khalidov, which took place on November 28, 2015, fought a duel with Artur Sowiński for the inaugural KSW Featherweight Championship, eventually losing by the judges' decision.

After another stint returning to Asia, picking two third round submission wins at Pancrase 277 and  Rebel FC 4, Kleber returned to KSW, facing Leszek Krakowski on October 1, 2016 at KSW 36. He won the bout via triangle choke in the first round.

On May 27, 2017, at the KSW 39 gala held at the Stadion Narodowy, he won the KSW Featherweight Championship, defeating then featherweight champion Marcin Wrzosek unanimously for points.

Kleber was to defend his title against Artur Sowiński at KSW 41 on December 23, 2017. However, after missing weight, Erbst was stripped of the belt, meaning only Sowiński was eligible for the title. Erbst won the bout via rear-naked choke in the third round.

Kleber was to rematch Marcin Wrzosek for the vacant featherweight title on June 9, 2018 at KSW 44. However Wrzosek suffered a pectoral muscle tear and was forced out of the rematch. As a result, Marian Ziolkowski stepped in against Erbst in a catchweight fight. Erbst won the bout via armbar in the first round.

Kleber faced Mateusz Gamrot on December 1, 2018 at KSW 46: Narkun vs. Khalidov 2. He lost the bout via an unanimous decision.

Rizin Fighting Federation 
After a first round submission win at ONE Japan Series against Akiyo Nishiura, Kleber made his Rizin debut on December 31, 2020 at during Rizin 26 against Kyle Aguon He won the bout via brabo choke in the first round.

Kleber faced Kazumasa Majima at Rizin 27 on March 21, 2021. He won via triangle choke in the second round.

Kleber faced Mikuru Asakura at Rizin 28. He won the bout after choking Mikuru unconscious via triangle choke.

Kleber headlined Rizin Trigger 2 on February 23, 2022 against Ulka Sasaki. After overcoming a knockdown in the first round, Kleber submitted Sasaki in the second round via rear-naked choke.

Kleber faced Kyohei Hagiwara on May 5, 2022 in the main event of Rizin Landmark 3.He won the bout in the first round with a face crank.

On October 23, 2022, Kleber faced reigning champion Juntaro Ushiku for the Rizin Featherweight Championship at Rizin 39.  taking control in the first round with a tackle takedown, and in the second round, he threw him down with a hip throw and set up a triangle choke to win by triangle choke to win the title.

Kleber faced reigning Bellator Featherweight Champion Patrício Pitbull in a non-title bout at Bellator MMA vs. Rizin on December 31, 2022. He lost the bout by unanimous decision.

Championships and accomplishments

Mixed martial arts 
Rizin Fighting Federation
 Rizin Featherweight Championship (One time, current)
Konfrontacja Sztuk Walki
 KSW Featherweight Championship (One time)
 Rebel FC
 Rebel FC Featherweight Tournament Winner

Mixed martial arts record

|-
|Loss
|align=center| 
|Patrício Pitbull
|Decision (unanimous)
|Bellator MMA vs. Rizin
|
|align=center| 3
|align=center| 5:00
|Saitama, Japan
|
|-
|Win
|align=center|
|Juntarou Ushiku
|Submission (triangle choke)
|Rizin 39
|
|align=center|2
|align=center|1:29
|Fukuoka, Japan
|
|-
|Win
|align=center|30–5–1
|Kyohei Hagiwara
|Submission (face crank)
|Rizin Landmark 3
|
|align=center|1
|align=center|1:37
|Tokyo, Japan
|
|-
|Win
|align=center|29–5–1
|Ulka Sasaki
|Submission (rear-naked choke)
|Rizin Trigger 2
|
|align=center|2
|align=center|3:22
|Fukuroi, Japan
|
|-
| Win
| align=center|28–5–1
|Mikuru Asakura
|Technical Submission (triangle choke)
|Rizin 28
|
|align=center|2
|align=center|1:49
|Tokyo, Japan
|
|-
| Win
| align=center|27–5–1
| Kazumasa Majima
|Submission (triangle choke)
|Rizin 27 
|
|align=center|2
|align=center|3:02
|Nagoya, Japan
|
|-
| Win
| align=center|26–5–1
| Kyle Aguon
| Technical Submission (brabo choke)
|Rizin 26
|
| align=center| 1
| align=center| 4:22
|Saitama, Japan
|
|-
| Win
| align=center|25–5–1
| Akiyo Nishiura
|Submission (brabo choke)
| ONE Japan Series: Road to Century
| 
| align=center| 1
| align=center| 2:15
| Tokyo, Japan
|
|-
| Loss
| align=center|24–5–1
| Mateusz Gamrot
| Decision (unanimous)
| KSW 46: Narkun vs. Khalidov 2
| 
|align=Center|5
|align=center|5:00
|Gliwice, Poland
| 
|-
| Win
| align=center|24–4–1
| Marian Ziółkowski
| Submission (armbar)
|KSW 44: The Game
|
| align=center| 1
| align=center| 3:44
|Gdańsk, Poland
|
|-
| Win
| align=center|23–4–1
| Artur Sowiński
| Submission (rear-naked choke)
|KSW 41: Mankowski vs. Soldic 
|
|align=center|3
|align=center|3:56
|Katowice, Poland
|
|-
| Win
| align=center|22–4–1
| Marcin Wrzosek
| Decision (unanimous)
|KSW 39: Colosseum
|
| align=center| 3
| align=center| 5:00
|Warszawa, Poland
|
|-
| Win
| align=center|21–4–1
| Leszek Krakowski
|Submission (triangle choke)
|KSW 36: Materla vs. Palhares
| 
|align=center|1
|align=center|4:24
|Zielona Góra, Poland
|
|-
| Win
| align=center|20–4–1
| George Hickman
| Submission (triangle choke)
| Rebel FC 4: Battle Royale Ascension
| 
|align=Center|3
|align=center|4:35
|Qingdao, China
| 
|-
| Win
| align=center|19–4–1
| Yusuke Yachi
| Submission (rear-naked choke)
| Pancrase 277
| 
| align=center| 3
| align=center| 0:37
| Tokyo, Japan
| 
|-
| Loss
| align=center|18–4–1
| Artur Sowiński
|Decision (unanimous)
|KSW 33: Materla vs. Khalidov
|
|align=center|3
|align=center|5:00
|Kraków, Poland
| 
|-
| Win
| align=center|18–3–1
| Miguel Torres
| Submission (brabo choke)
|rowspan=2 | Rebel FC 3: The Promised Ones
|rowspan=2 |
| align=center| 2
| align=center| 4:40
|rowspan=2 |Qingdao, China
| 
|-
| Win
| align=center|17–3–1
| Takahiro Ashida
| Submission (triangle choke)
| align=center| 1
| align=center| 3:06
|
|-
| Win
| align=center|16–3–1
| Anzor Azhiev
| Submission (triangle choke)
|KSW 30: Genesis
|
| align=center| 1
| align=center| 3:16
|Poznań, Poland
|
|-
| Win
| align=center|15–3–1
| Katsuyoshi Beppu
|Submission (triangle choke)
|Deep: Hamamatsu Impact 2014
|
|align=center|3
|align=center|1:29
|Hamamatsu, Japan
|
|-
| Win
| align=center|14–3–1
| Hideki Kadowaki
| Submission (rear-naked choke)
| DEEP: Cage Impact 2013
| 
| align=center| 1
| align=center| 4:21
| Tokyo, Japan
|
|-
| Win
| align=center|13–3–1
| Yutaka Ueda
|TKO (punches)
|Deep: Cage Impact 2013 in Hamamatsu
| 
|align=center|2
|align=center|2:81
|Hamamatsu, Japan
|
|-
| Win
| align=center|12–3–1
| Liu Si Cong
| Submission (triangle choke)
| Real Fight MMA Championship 2
| 
|align=Center|1
|align=center|2:19
|Zhengzhou, China
| 
|-
| Win
| align=center|11–3–1
| Albert Cheng
| Submission (triangle choke)
| Real Fight MMA Championship 1
| 
| align=center| 1
| align=center| 4:00
| Zhengzhou, China
| 
|-
| Win
| align=center|10–3–1
| Teppei Hori
|Submission (triangle choke)
|Rings: Vol. 2: Conquisito
|
|align=center|1
|align=center|2:40
|Tokyo, Japan
| 
|-
| Win
| align=center|9–3–1
| Atsushi Ueda
|Submission (armbar)
| ZST: Battle Hazard 6
|
|align=center| 3
|align=center| 3:07
|Tokyo, Japan
|
|-
| Win
| align=center|8–3–1
| Yoshifumi Dogaki
| Submission (armbar)
|Heat 23
|
| align=center| 1
| align=center| 4:06
| Kobe, Japan
|
|-
| Win
| align=center|7–3–1
| Hidenobu Koike
|Submission (triangle choke)
| Deep: Cage Impact 2011 in Hamamatsu
| 
| align=center|1
| align=center|2:16
| Hamamatsu, Japan
|
|-
| Win
| align=center|6–3–1
|Shinichiro Tanaka
|Submission (triangle choke)
| Deep: Shizuoka Impact 2011
| 
| align=center|1
| align=center|3:18
| Shizuoka, Japan
|
|-
| Win
| align=center|5–3–1
| Yusuke Hoshiko
|Decision (unanimous)
|Heat 16
|
|align=center|3
|align=center|5:00
|Osaka, Japan
|
|-
| Draw
| align=center|4–3–1
| Mitsuru Yamaguchi
| Draw
| Deep: Cage Impact 2010 in Hamamatsu
| 
| align=center| 2
| align=center| 5:00
| Hamamatsu, Japan
|
|-
| Loss
| align=center| 4–3
| Toshiaki Kitada
| Submission (armbar)
|Deep: 44 Impact
|
|align=center|2
|align=center|0:56
|Tokyo, Japan
| 
|-
| Win
| align=center| 4–2
| Takashi Fujii
| KO (head kick)
| Deep: Hamamatsu Impact
| 
| align=center| 1
| align=center| 2:40
| Hamamatsu, Japan
| 
|-
| Loss
| align=center| 3–2
| Yoshiro Maeda
| DQ (groin strike)
| Deep: Osaka Impact
| 
| align=center| 1
| align=center| 4:00
| Osaka, Japan
| 
|-
| Loss
| align=center| 3–1
| Toshikazu Iseno
| Decision (unanimous)
| Deep: 42 Impact
| 
| align=center| 2
| align=center| 5:00
| Tokyo, Japan
| 
|-
| Win
| align=center| 3–0
| Yasutomo Katsuki
| Submission (rear-naked choke)
|rowspan=2 |Heat: New Age Cup 1
|rowspan=2 |
| align=center| 1
| align=center| 3:28
|rowspan=2 |Nagoya, Japan
| 
|-
| Win
| align=center| 2–0
| Keizo Sakuragi
| Submission (rear-naked choke)
| align=center| 2
| align=center| 2:39
|
|-
| Win
| align=center| 1–0
| Masaki Wada
| Submission (rear-naked choke)
| Deep: clubDeep Hamamatsu
| 
| align=center| 1
| align=center| 1:11
| Hamamatsu, Japan
|

See also 

 List of current Rizin FF fighters
 List of male mixed martial artists

Footnotes 

Brazilian male mixed martial artists
Japanese male mixed martial artists
Mixed martial artists utilizing Brazilian jiu-jitsu
Mixed martial artists utilizing shootboxing
Brazilian practitioners of Brazilian jiu-jitsu
Japanese practitioners of Brazilian jiu-jitsu
People awarded a black belt in Brazilian jiu-jitsu
Japanese people of Brazilian descent
People from Shizuoka Prefecture
1989 births
Living people
Sportspeople from São Paulo